"Flamingo" and "Teenage Riot" are songs by Japanese singer Kenshi Yonezu, released together as a double A-side single on October 31, 2018. It is Yonezu's ninth single, and his fifth single since moving to Sony Music.

Creation 
"Flamingo" contains a number of voice samples, including "trembling lips", purring, clearing throats, and even what sounds like fragments of a conversation, such as "ah, yep". Initially, Yonezu created up to the first chorus in a simple, minimalist form with just bass, a kick drum and snare, but felt that after he added voices the song was complete. Yonezu was also influenced by recalling things from when he had been drinking. The song is told from the perspective of a pleasure-seeking person.

Track listing

Charts

References 

2018 singles
Kenshi Yonezu songs
Oricon Weekly number-one singles
Songs about birds
Sony Music Entertainment Japan singles